China Screen is an annual independent Chinese documentary film festival organized by "Les Écrans des Mondes," a non-profit organization founded in 2007 in Paris.  Known in France as "Les Écrans de Chine," the festival was set up to promote dialogue about and understanding of modern-day China.  Festival president Michel Noll, a documentary producer and director himself, is also the founder of ICTV, the Paris-based documentary production and distribution company, as well as Quartier Latin Media, a small, independent Studio based in London.

The festival has become a Europe-wide event, with several screenings taking place in Italy, Germany, Greece and Finland during the week of the festival.

Films features in 2021 

Forêt écarlate, de Jin Huaqing, 83 min
Un mariage Kazakh en Chine, de Huang Yuqing, 57 min
Une année, de Zhou Hao, 92 min
Un village en voie de disparition, de Liu Feifang, 172 min
Taïwan, une démocratie à l'ombre de la Chine, de Alain Lewkowicz, 52 min
Le vent du Sud, de Zhang Zhiqiang, 65 min
Heidi en Chine, de François Yang, 82 min

Films features in 2020 

Le chirurgien magique, de HAN Jingyuan, 86 min
Une décision, de Maso Chen, 71 min
Viens me voir dans mes rêves, de LI Li, 96 min
De père en fils au pays Hakka, de HUANG Weishan, 73 min
Notre machine à explorer le temps, de Yang Sun & Leo Chiang, 81 min
Les deux vies de Li Ermao, de JIA Yuchuan, 89 min
Les immortels du village, YU Giangyi, 111 min
Une route pour Xiao Jiang, de Jean-Michel Corillion, 52 min

Films featured in 2019 

Marceline. Une femme. Un siècle, de Cordelia Dvoràk, 76 min 
Une nouvelle ère, de Boris Svartzman, 71 min 
Rêve chinois, de Léna Karbe & Tristan Coloma, 39 min
Rêve de Confucius, de Mijie Li,  86 min
Shangri-la, de Zhou Weiping, 57 min
Lettre de Mansanja, de LEE Leon, 76 min
Bonjour Pekin, de Jianying WAN, 85 min
Soeur ainée, de ZHENG Long, 94 min
Sulu, de Leiyu QIN, 47 min
Une rude transition, de Juan LI, 85 min

Films featured in 2018 
 Still Tomorrow, 88 min 
 A Chinese Sketch Book, 65 min
 I've got the Blues, 90 min
 The Observer, 79 min 
 Turtle Rock, 101 min
 Family in the Sinkhole, 71 min
 Song from Maidichong, 81 min
 Lady of the Harbour, 87 min
 Times in a Town, 45 min

Films featured in 2017 
 Lune de fer de Xiaoyu Qin et Feiyue Wu, 84 min
 Les oubliés de la nuit de Jordan Paterson, 95 min
 L'autre moitié du ciel de Patrick Soergel, 80 min
 Mon père et ma mère de Jiao Bo, 88 min
 Les Van Goghs chinois de Yu Haibo et Yu Tianqi Kiki, 80 min
 Les évadés du temples de Patrick Carr, 88 min
 Terres brulées de An Jiaxing, 75 min
Jury : Deanna Gao, Hans Van Duysen, Xiayong Lei, Johannes-Oliver Hamm, Lena Karbe

Films featured in 2016 
 Montagnes de poussière de Zhu Yu, 86 min
 En quête d'amour de Yun Ye, 145 min
 Un jeune patriote de Du Haibin, 105 min
 Sur la piste de Yu Bin de Jean-Christophe Yu, 105 min
 Une porte de secours de Zheng Cherelle, 94 min
 Héros ou Rebelle ? de Larry Chan, 87 min
 Génération 90 de He Wenzhong, 85 min

Films featured in 2015 
 Rendre la lumière de Carol Liu, 52 min
 Prouesses au prix fort de Jin Huaqing, 38 min
 Passion magnolia de Ma Zhidan, 52 min
 Territoires inconnus du collectif Blanck Lands, 85 min
 Le Maire chinois de Zhou Hao, 86 min
 Fleuve de beaux-arts de Shih Charlene, 52 min
 Une ville minée de Jin Huaqing, 27 min
 Recherche âme sœur, désespérément de Chou Tung-yen, 55 min
 La Dernière Danse du dragon de Ma Zhidan et Lu Yang, 52 min
 Madame Duan de Zhang Weixiong, Xiao Cong, Liu Zaili & Deng Jiangao, 52 min
 La Révolte des tournesols (collectif), 120 min
 Les Trois Rêves chinois de Nick Torrens, 85 min
 Fleurs de Taipei de Hsieh Chin-lin, 109 min
 Rendre la lumière de Carol Liu, 55 min
 Rêves de piano de Han Junqian, 54 min
 Pelerinage depuis la Chine de Cammile F.Faylona, 45 min

Films featured in 2014 
4th edition of the festival
 Coton de Zhou Hao, 52 min
 Taishan notre patrie de Xu Hualin, 45 min
 Les Neuf Vies de monsieur Lee de Lei Giazhen et Liang Bahoua, 53 min
 Toujours courir de Jang Dajung, 70 min
 Rêves et réalités, des vies en devenir de Wong Siu Pong, 60 Min
 Les Passe-murailles de Hao Zhiniang, 60 Min
 L'Enfant et la Centrale de Wu Jie, 61 min
 Un père chinois de Ma Zhidan, 45 min
 Un rendez-vous sous les étoiles de Ma Zhidan, 50 min
 Mon chez moi de Cui Yi, 86 min
 Chroniques d'un village ordinaire de Jiao Bo, 97 min
 Le Dernier Petit Train de Chine de Wang Tongxuan, 50 min
 La Vie en roue libre de Shen Ko-Shang, 54 min
 Les jardins secrets de l'empereur de Zhou Bing et Mandy Chang, 56 min
 Pavillon rouge de Lu Jing et Wang Chi, 52 min

Films featured in 2013 
 L'Ancienne Beijing de Stuart Rose, 60 min
 Conçu en Chine de Rob Slater, 60 min
 Pèlerinage depuis la Chine de Camille Faylona, 45 min
 Eaux troubles de Fei Youming et Liu Shuo, 52 min
 Une double peine de Tang Jiongming, 52 min
 Décor de rêves de Zhong Yan, 52 min
 Mes beaux talons de Ho Chao-Ti, 55 min
 E cha de Rong Xie, 90 min
 Rêves de Jin Huaqing, 38 min
 La Fille électro de Zhang Yixin et Lin Jiayi, 21 min
 Les Jardins secrets de l'empereur de Zhou Bing et Mandy Chang, 56 min
 Champs de riz en terrasse de Zhou Weiping, 52 min
 Miroir du vide de Ma Li, 120 min
 Épreuves chinoises de Yang Wang, 73 min
 Un ciel dégagé de Harhuu, 72 min
 Une rencontre de Feng Lei, 85 min
 L'École des champions de Chang Yung, 93 min
 Point d'enquête de Fu Yong, 90 min
 De la Chine vers l'Afrique de Gao Song, 52 min
 Bûcheron de Tu Guangyi, 100 min

Films featured in 2012 
2nd edition of the festival
 La Route du thé de Zhou Weiping et Michel Noll, 100 min
 Le Palais d' été de Zhou Weiping et Michel Noll, 100 min
 Saveurs et Servitudes de Wang Feng, 52 min
 Umbrella de Du Habin, 92 min
 The Bund de Zhou Bing, 105 min
 Solide comme un roc de Shan Zuolong, 52 min
 Mon dernier secret de Li Xiaofeng et Kai Jii, 52 min
 Les Marins verts du Yangtsé de Chen Fu, 52 min
 Disorder de Huang Weikai, 59 min
 Nu Shu, secrets de femmes de Yang Yue-Qing, 54 min
 Du bio, envers et contre tous de Wei Shi, 52 min
 Une vie au village de Zhou Hao et Tan Jiaying, 52 min
 Les Secrets du pigeon laqué de Zheng Xiaolei, 50 min
 La Maison de monsieur Jiang de Gan Choao et Liang Zi, 52 min
 Trois cordes pour deux conteurs de Zhang Wenqing, 52 min
 L'Enfant de personne de Gan Chao, 52 min
 D'un patient à l'autre de Zhang Wenqing, 52 min
 Une saison comme une autre de Zhang Wenqing, 52 min
 Une vie meilleure de Zhao Hao, 52 min
 Mères et Filles de Zheng Xiaolei et Danielle Elissef, 52 min
 1428 de Du Haibin, 116 min
 Les marins verts du Yangtsé de Chen Fu et Cheng Shiping, 52 min

Films featured in 2009 
 La Maison de monsieur Jiang de Gan Chao et Liang Zi, 52 min
 La Grande Famille de Huang Lingping, 52 min
 Le nouvel abri de Zheng Xiaolei et LI Lin, 52 min
 Nu Shu de Yang Yue-Qing, 52 min
 Rêves de piano de Han Junqian, 52 min
 Les Diplômés de Gao song, 52 min
 L'Enfant de personne de Gan Chao, 52 min
 La Dernière Migration de Huang Lingping et Zhong Yan, 52 min
 Le tribunal itinérant de Zhan Wenqing, 54 min
 Trois cordes pour deux conteurs de Zhang Wenqing, 54 min
 Une saison comme une autre de Zhang Wenqing, 54 min
 D'un patient à l'autre de Zhang Wenqing, 54 min

References

External links 

 Official Site
 Ictv.fr

Film festivals in Paris
Documentary film festivals in France